AnnaTommy is a 1995 education game developed by Viridis Corporation and published by IVI Publishing for Windows. It was one of 5 titles they released with IVI.

The game was created using an authoring system called CyberCad, and used early 3D software Infini-D.

By April 1994 it was due for release that fall.

NY Daily News deemed it "a nicely done CD rip-off of the old "Incredible Journey" movie". Los Angeles Times felt it was "reminiscent of some ‘60s sci-fi flicks" and that its educational content came across as an afterthought detached from the gameplay.

References

External links 
 
 bloomberg.com/news/articles/1994-12-11/to-tickle-the-tykes
 https://www.chicagotribune.com/news/ct-xpm-1994-11-25-9411250037-story.html

1995 video games
Educational video games
Medical video games
Single-player video games
Video games developed in the United States
Windows games
Windows-only games